Tagro Baléguhé (born 23 March 1978) is a former Ivorian footballer who played as a striker. He began his career at French club Olympique de Marseille, before moving to FC Martigues. In 2005, he joined Reims.

References

1978 births
Living people
People from Sassandra-Marahoué District
Association football forwards
Ivorian footballers
Olympique de Marseille players
FC Martigues players
FC Rouen players
FC Gueugnon players
Stade de Reims players
Nîmes Olympique players
AC Arlésien players
Ligue 1 players
Ligue 2 players